Jens Erik Roepstorff (born 5 August 1960) is a former Danish handball player who competed in the 1984 Summer Olympics.

He played his club handball with Helsingør IF. In 1984 he finished fourth with the Denmark men's national handball team in the 1984 Olympic tournament. He played all six matches and scored 15 goals.

External links
Sports-Reference profile

1960 births
Living people
Danish male handball players
Olympic handball players of Denmark
Handball players at the 1984 Summer Olympics